Juan Hurtado de Mendoza y Guzmán, 3rd Lord and 1st Marquis of Cañete  (died 1490) was a Spanish nobleman and military leader.

He was the son of Don Diego Hurtado de Mendoza (Admiral of Castile) and of his second wife Teresa de Guzmán. He was elevated to Marquis of Cañete in 1490 by the Catholic Monarchs, who did not know that he had died some days before.

Additional information

Notes

Sources

1490 deaths
Juan 01
Spanish generals
Juan 01
Year of birth unknown